Janus Robberts (born 10 March 1979 in Louis Trichardt) is a South African athlete who competes in the shot put, and occasionally discus throw. He is the current African record holder in shot put with 21.97 metres, and also a former junior world record holder. He also holds the African indoor record with 21.47 metres, achieved in December 2001 in Norman.

Achievements

References

External links 

1979 births
Living people
People from Louis Trichardt
South African male shot putters
South African male discus throwers
Olympic athletes of South Africa
Athletes (track and field) at the 2000 Summer Olympics
Athletes (track and field) at the 2004 Summer Olympics
Athletes (track and field) at the 1998 Commonwealth Games
Athletes (track and field) at the 2002 Commonwealth Games
Athletes (track and field) at the 2006 Commonwealth Games
Commonwealth Games gold medallists for South Africa
Commonwealth Games silver medallists for South Africa
Commonwealth Games medallists in athletics
African Games silver medalists for South Africa
African Games medalists in athletics (track and field)
Athletes (track and field) at the 1999 All-Africa Games
Sportspeople from Limpopo
African Championships in Athletics winners
South African Athletics Championships winners
20th-century South African people
21st-century South African people
Medallists at the 2002 Commonwealth Games
Medallists at the 2006 Commonwealth Games